Pasternak or Pasternack (Cyrillic: Пастернак) means parsnip, Pastinaca sativa, in Polish, Romanian, Russian, Ukrainian, Belarusian, and Yiddish. Notable people with the last name "Pasternak" include:
 Anne Pasternak (born 1964), American art critic
 Ben Pasternak (born 1999), Australian co-founder and CEO of Monkey Inc.
 Boris Pasternak (1890–1960), Russian/Soviet poet and novelist
 Bruce Pasternack (1947–2021), American corporate executive
 Carol Braun Pasternack, American scholar of English medieval literature and language
 David Pastrňák (born 1996), Czech ice hockey player
 Harley Pasternak (born 1974), Canadian-American personal trainer
 Igor Pasternak, Soviet-born US airship designer, founder and CEO of Worldwide Aeros Corp.
 James Pasternak, Canadian politician
 Joe Pasternack (born 1977), American college basketball coach
 Joseph "Joe" Pasternak (1901–1991), Hungarian-US film producer
 Josef Pasternack (1881–1940), Polish conductor and composer
 Kenneth Pasternak (born 1954), American businessman
 Leon Pasternak (1910–1969), Polish poet and satirist 

 Leonid Pasternak (1862–1945), Russian painter, father of Boris Pasternak
 Marco Pasternak, character in Better Call Saul
 Michael Joseph Pasternak, known as Emperor Rosko (born 1942), American pop music presenter
 Natalia Pasternak Taschner, Brazilian microbiologist
 Reagan Pasternak (born 1977), Canadian actress and singer
 Velvel Pasternak (1933–2019), Canadian-American Jewish ethnomusicologist

Slavic words and phrases
Slavic-language surnames
Russian-language surnames
Jewish surnames